Rev. William Winterbotham (15 December 1763 – 31 March 1829) was a British Baptist minister and a political prisoner. He wrote some books introducing general information about China and the United States.

Biography

William Winterbotham was born in Little Minories, Aldgate, London on 15 December 1763. He was a son of John Winterbotham and Miss Elizabeth Hyett. She was a Gloucestershire woman, and her parents, who lived in Cheltenham had a large influence on William's childhood.

At a very early age he was sent to his grandparents' home in Cheltenham, where he lived till his 10th birthday. It was his grandparents who taught him to think for himself. One of his grandfather's quotes was "To be poor may be neither disgraceful nor fault" and "To be mean and dependent is always disgraceful".

William left Cheltenham to return to his parents in London in 1774, where he was apprenticed out as a silversmith at the age of 13 years for 15/- a week. One day he agreed with his brother "to go and hear the devil's preach", for thus they spoke of an African man who was there preaching in open spaces in London. They went, and his brother was saved that day. His brother's temperament and change deeply affected him so he was persuaded to accompany his brother to a meeting in Pennington Street where a Mr Radford was preaching. It was here in 1796 that he himself was converted. His parents were not happy with William's decision because "to become a Dissenter" was considered wrong for him and a disgrace to his parents.

He had promised to accompany a preacher to Sydenham Common to hear an open-air service, but at the last minute the preacher failed to turn up, so they asked William to take his place. He conducted the service with so much enthusiasm that he was asked to preach at Beckenham that same night.

It was in 1789 he was baptised in the river at Old Ford and thus became a Baptist minister. In the same year, he was asked to assist a Mr Gibbs, the pastor of the Baptist church at How's Lane, Plymouth, and in the following year he settled in the area.

The church William ministered began to grow in number and strength. It was three years since he settled in Plymouth that he preached the two sermons which cost him his freedom.

In the first – preached on 5 November 1792 on "The commemoration of National Deliverance" – he referred to the French Revolution, that was taking place at the time, and spoke ot with some commendation.

The following is a brief extract from the close of the sermon – "Take no doctrine on trust: you have the scriptures in your hands, use them as the touchstone of truth:- persecute no man for his religious tenets; labour to spread abroad the rays of divine truth; attend with diligence to the instruction of the rising generation, and instil into their minds proper principles of civil and religious liberty. As Britons, it behoves you in the present important crisis to act with that dignity which has long characterised this nation".

In the second sermon of 18 November 1792, there is scarcely an illusion of political matters, unless a reference to the African slave trade may be so called.

Because he expressed radical views in his sermons, Winterbotham was put into jail in Newgate Prison in 1793 and released in 1797.

The first trial took place before the Hon Baron Perryn and a special jury at Exeter on 25 July 1793. The proceedings were taken in shorthand by a Mr William Bowring and later William Winterbotham published the book. The Council for the Crown was – Mr Sergeant Rooke; Mr Seargeant Lawrence; Mr Morris; Mr Fanshaw; Mr Clapp. Solicitors – Messrs Elford and Foot of Plymouth Dock.

Council for the defendant were – Mr Gibbs, Mr East, Mr Dampier. Solicitor – Mr John Saunders of Plymouth. He was found guilty by a packed jury after two and a half hours deliberation and found Guilty.

The Rev William's second appearance was before Baron Perryn on 26 July 1793 for the sermon preached by him on 18 November 1792. He was sentenced to four years imprisonment and 200 pounds fine.

When he was in prison, he wrote An Historical, Geographical and Philosophical View of the Chinese Empire (1795), which provides general information about China, and An Historical, Geographical, Commercial, and Philosophical View of the American United States (4 vols, London, 1799).

On 26 November 1797 he married Mary Brend and they had seven children (4 sons and 3 daughters); he died on 31 March 1829 in Stroud, Gloucestershire.

His granddaughter was Ann S. Stephens.

Notes

References
The Stroud Journal dated 30 September 1892 and Titled – THE REV WILLIAM WINTERBOTHAM.
Trials of William Winterbotham for seditious words – on 25 July 1793; for seditious words charged to have been uttered in two sermons preached on 5 and 18 November 1792. (Fourth Edition) Printed LONDON 1794 for Wm Winterbotham.

Further reading
 W. Winterbotham. An historical, geographical, commercial, and philosophical view of the United States of America, and of the European settlements in America and the West-Indies. v.1, v.4

External links

 Portrait of Winterbotham
 

1763 births
1829 deaths
People from Aldgate
English non-fiction writers
18th-century English Baptist ministers
19th-century English Baptist ministers
English prisoners and detainees
English male non-fiction writers